The 1984 Pittsburgh Open, also known as the Ginny of Pittsburgh,  was a women's tennis tournament played on indoor carpet courts at the Greentree Racquet Club in Pittsburgh, Pennsylvania in the United States that was part of the Ginny Tournament Circuit of the 1984 Virginia Slims World Championship Series. It was the third edition of the tournament and was held from January 23 through January 29, 1984. Fifth-seeded Andrea Leand won the singles title.

Finals

Singles
 Andrea Leand defeated  Pascale Paradis 0–6, 6–2, 6–4
 It was Leand's 1st and only career singles title.

Doubles
 Christiane Jolissaint /  Marcella Mesker defeated  Anna-Maria Fernandez /  Trey Lewis 6–2, 6–3
 It was Jolissaint's 1st title of the year and the 2nd of her career. It was Mesker's 2nd title of the year and the 4th of her career.

Notes

References

External links
 ITF tournament edition details
 Tournament pamphlet

Pittsburgh Open
Pittsburgh Open